Hugh James McLaughlin (16 July 1909 – 4 February 1977) was an Australian rules footballer who played with South Melbourne and Footscray in the Victorian Football League (VFL) during the 1930s.

Family
The son of Hugh James McLaughlin (1882-1918), and Bridget Agnes McLaughlin (1887-1915), née Buckley, Hugh James McLaughlin was born in Stirling, Scotland on 16 July 1909.

He married Karen Emily Barbara Muster on 6 January 1934. Their son, Hugh McLaughlin Jr., also played over 100 games for South Melbourne and also represented Victoria at interstate level.

Football

South Melbourne
McLaughlin was a gutsy half back flanker for South Melbourne, and was a key player with the 1933 premiership side. As well as playing 96 games for South Melbourne, he also represented Victoria at interstate football.

Footscray
In 1935 he his request for a clearance to Footscray was granted because he lived in the area.

Death
He died at the Western General Hospital, in Footscray, Victoria, on the 4 February 1977.

Footnotes

References
 McLaughlin's Career, The Argus, (Friday, 4 September 1936), p.9.
 'Forward', "Footscray Captain Resigns: Dockendorff's Move: Morrison Elected: McLaughlin's Position", The Age, (Wednesday, 7 July 1937), p.17.
 "When Irish Eyes are Smiling": Still the Masterpiece of Hughie McLaughlin, The (Emerald Hill) Record, (Saturday, 12 June 1937), p.5.

External links
 
 
 Hugh McLaughlin, at Boyles Football Photos.

1909 births
1977 deaths
Sportspeople from Stirling
VFL/AFL players born outside Australia
Australian rules footballers from Victoria (Australia)
Sydney Swans players
Sydney Swans Premiership players
Western Bulldogs players
Scottish emigrants to Australia
One-time VFL/AFL Premiership players
Scottish players of Australian rules football